Royal Sovereign lighthouse, located  offshore from Eastbourne, is a decommissioned lighthouse marking the Royal Sovereign shoal, a sandbank named after HMS Royal Sovereign.   Its distinctive shape is easily recognised as it comprises a large platform (which functions as a helicopter deck) supported by a single pillar rising out of the water. Originally, the platform was manned by three full-time keepers, accommodation being contained in the 'cabin section' immediately below the platform. Additional accommodation was provided for up to four visiting maintenance workers.

Construction and installation
The lighthouse replaced a lightship that had marked the Royal Sovereign Shoal since 1875. The structure was built, in two parts, on Newhaven beach, and put into position in 1970. First, the base and attached column were floated out to the shoal, where the hollow base was flooded and allowed to sink into position. Then the cabin section and superstructure were floated out, positioned over the base and allowed to settle on to the column as the tide fell.

Operation
The lighthouse was brought into operation at noon on 6 September 1971, whereupon the lightship was towed away. Initially, the light source was a 1,000 watt bulb set within a revolving 3.5 order catadioptric optic, mounted in a superstructure on the corner of the platform. Beneath the lantern, on two intermediate levels, were the sounder, air tanks and associated equipment for the diaphone fog horn, below which the main control room was located (on platform-level). Power was provided by four 20 kW diesel generators, housed in the cabin section of the structure along with two diesel compressors (which, as well as supplying the fog horn, powered a crane on the platform).

The light was automated in 1994. At the same time, the optic and lamp were replaced (reducing the range to ) and converted to solar-powered operation, and the fog horn replaced by an electric emitter. As of 2006 the light was controlled by a 475 MHz radio link to Trinity House managed by Vodafone; the platform was still occasionally occupied.

Decommissioning
In June 2019, Trinity House announced that the lighthouse would be decommissioned, and then removed, because of the platform's structural condition. Beachy Head light, the "principal aid to navigation in the area", will be upgraded. Having undertaken a site inspection in 2021, representatives of the Trinity House Board made it known that they intended to award the contract for removal in 2022 (once all necessary permissions had been sought), after which it was envisaged that the decommissioning would take place progressively over the course of three summers. 

The lighthouse was permanently taken out of service on March 21, 2022, as issued under Admiralty navigational warnings:
211355 UTC Mar 22	ENGLISH CHANNEL. Beachy Head Eastwards. Royal Sovereign Lighthouse permanently discontinued and light-buoys temporarily established.

UK Coastal

WZ 380/22

211355 UTC Mar 22

ENGLISH CHANNEL. 

Beachy Head Eastwards.

1. Cardinal light buoys temporarily established North, East, South, and West of Royal Sovereign Lighthouse, 50-43.5N 000-26.1E; South cardinal with AIS and Racon (T), North cardinal with fog signal.

2. Lighthouse permanently discontinued.

3. Cancel WZ 364.
At the time of its decommissioning, Ian McNaught, Deputy Master of Trinity House, observed it was not an easy decision for Trinity House to have decided to decommission the lighthouse.

See also

 List of lighthouses in England

References

External links 

 Trinity House
 Closeup of Royal Sovereign Lighthouse
 1972 documentary on the construction and installation of the lighthouse.

Lighthouses completed in 1971
Buildings and structures in East Sussex
Lighthouses in England
Lighthouses of the English Channel